Eliza Clark (born May 22, 1963) is a Canadian writer.

Born in Toronto, Ontario, she received a Bachelor of Fine Arts from York University in 1985. Clark has also taught creative writing at Ryerson University, the Humber School for Writers and York University.

Bibliography
 Miss You Like Crazy, 1991.
 What You Need, 1994.
 Butterflies and Bottlecaps, 1996.
 Seeing and Believing, 1999.
 Bite the Stars: A Novel, 2000.

Awards
 Short listed, Trillium Book Award, for Miss You Like Crazy, 1991.
 Short listed, Stephen Leacock Memorial Medal for Humour, for Miss You Like Crazy, 1992.
 Short listed, Giller Prize, for What You Need, 1994.

External links
 Eliza Clark archives at the Clara Thomas Archives and Special Collections, York University Libraries, Toronto, Ontario
 Interview, online from CBC Words at Large

1963 births
Living people
20th-century Canadian novelists
21st-century Canadian novelists
Writers from Toronto
Canadian women novelists
20th-century Canadian women writers
21st-century Canadian women writers